Denis Igorevich Lukyanov (born 14 July 1989) is a Russian athletics competitor competing in the hammer throw. In 2019, he competed in the men's hammer throw at the 2019 World Athletics Championships held in Doha, Qatar. He did not qualify to compete in the final.

In 2015, he competed in the men's hammer throw at the 2015 Summer Universiade held in Gwangju, South Korea. He finished in 5th place.

In 2019, he represented Europe in The Match Europe v USA where he finished in 6th place in the men's hammer throw event. He won the bronze medal in the men's hammer throw at the 2019 Military World Games held in Wuhan, China.

References

External links 
 

Living people
1989 births
Place of birth missing (living people)
Russian male hammer throwers
Authorised Neutral Athletes at the World Athletics Championships
Competitors at the 2015 Summer Universiade
Russian Athletics Championships winners